Angelica Östlund (born 5 July 1991) is a Swedish bandy player and former professional ice hockey forward. She is the all-time leading scorer for Brynäs IF Dam of the Swedish Women's Hockey League (SDHL) and served as the club's captain from 2013 to 2018. Östlund participated in 38 matches with the Swedish national team.

Career 
Östlund saw her first hockey match at the age of two, watching Brynäs IF play in the Elitserien. In 2004, she began playing for the club's women's side.

She was named an assistant captain for the club in 2009, and would put up a career best 39 points in 28 games in the 2009–10 Riksserien season. She would score 29 points in 28 games in 2011–12, as Brynäs finished as regular season champions for the first time. She became club captain in 2013.

In March 2018, she announced that she was leaving ice hockey at the age of 26, although she would join a Brynäs task force to try and solve the issues with the club's women's side. In May that year, she signed a three-year contract with bandy club Skutskärs IF. In 2019, Skutskärs made it to the Swedish championship finals.

International 
Östlund represented Sweden at the IIHF World Women's U18 Championships in 2008 and 2009, winning a bronze medal at the 2009 tournament. She would go on to make multiple appearances with the senior national team throughout her career, but was never able to secure a spot on a senior World Championship or Olympic roster.

References

External links

1991 births
Brynäs IF Dam players
Living people
Swedish bandy players
Swedish women's ice hockey centres
Skutskärs IF players
People from Tierp Municipality
Sportspeople from Uppsala County
21st-century Swedish women